In particle physics, a vector boson is a boson whose spin equals one. The vector bosons that are regarded as elementary particles in the Standard Model are the gauge bosons, the force carriers of fundamental interactions: the photon of electromagnetism, the W and Z bosons of the weak interaction, and the gluons of the strong interaction. Some composite particles are vector bosons, for instance any vector meson (quark and antiquark). During the 1970s and 1980s, intermediate vector bosons (the W and Z bosons, which mediate the weak interaction) drew much attention in particle physics.

A pseudovector boson is a vector boson that has even parity, whereas "regular" vector bosons have odd parity. There are no fundamental pseudovector bosons, but there are pseudovector mesons.

In relation to the Higgs boson

The W and Z particles interact with the Higgs boson as shown in the Feynman diagram.

Explanation
The name vector boson arises from quantum field theory. The component of such a particle's spin along any axis has the three eigenvalues −, 0, and + (where  is the reduced Planck constant), meaning that any measurement of its spin can only yield one of these values. (This is true for massive vector bosons; the situation differs for massless particles such as the photon, for reasons beyond the scope of this article. See Wigner's classification.)

The space of spin states therefore is a discrete degree of freedom consisting of three states, the same as the number of components of a vector in three-dimensional space. Quantum superpositions of these states can be taken such that they transform under rotations just like the spatial components of a rotating vector (the so called 3 representation of SU(2)). If the vector boson is taken to be the quantum of a field, the field is a vector field, hence the name.

The boson part of the name arises from the spin-statistics relation, which requires that all integer spin particles be bosons.

See also
 Scalar boson
 Maxwell's equations
 Proca action

References

Bosons
Mesons
Gauge theories
Particle physics